The Trevallyn Dam is a dam on the South Esk River in Launceston, Tasmania, Australia and is used to provide water for hydroelectricity. The dam was completed in 1955 as part of the Trevallyn Hydro Electric Scheme and now holds the waters of Lake Trevallyn.

Specifications
Lake Trevallyn is a concrete gravity dam built on Dolerite bedrock. The spillway height is 26.8 metres and the dam wall is 177 metres long. The lake has a surface area of 1.48 km² and storage capacity of 12.33 million m³. ANCOLD lists Trevallyn Dam as having a dam wall height of 33 metres and the total volume of the wall as 61,000 cubic metres.

The dam diverts water to the Trevallyn Power Station through a 3.2 km tunnel.

Lake Trevallyn
Lake Trevallyn is the long, narrow lake created by the dam and extends as far as Hadspen where the first rapids begin at the junction of the Meander and South Esk Rivers. The widest point on the lake is at Stephenson's Bay where it reaches 390m wide.

Launceston's outer suburb of Blackstone Heights and part of the Trevallyn State Recreation Area form part of the shore of Lake Trevallyn. Land around the lake is a mixture of suburbs, agricultural land and dry eucalypt forest.

Facilities
The lake and some of the surrounding land is used as a recreation area.  Most facilities are located at Aquatic Point which include a boat launching ramp, jetty and ski-jump. A walking track connects Aquatic Point to the dam wall and Trevallyn State Recreation Area. The dam wall features a viewing platform, parkland and barbecue facilities. Most areas of the lake are open to boating and fishing with the exception of waters near the dam and penstock intake.

Algal Blooms
Lake Trevallyn is often prone to algal blooms in the warm summer months. The blooms are due to high nutrient levels from sewerage treatment and fertilizers, limited water movement and warm temperatures. The main species is Anabaena circinalis and though it has the potential to be toxic, no blooms recorded in the lake have proven to be toxic to date. Since 2007, a monitoring program has been in place to keep a check on algal levels and to notify authorities when blooms occur.

Jellyfish
In 2009, scientists discovered the freshwater jellyfish, Craspedacusta sowerbyi, in the waters of Lake Trevallyn close to Blackstone Heights. Believed to have been brought by migrating birds from China, the jellyfish were accidentally discovered during routine water testing. The jellyfish are non-venomous and translucent with average sizes around 2 cm across. Though introduced, the jellyfish are believed to have a beneficial impact on the area as they consume the larvae of mosquitoes. A few specimens were temporarily displayed at the QVMAG in Launceston after the discovery was made.

See also

List of reservoirs and dams in Tasmania

References

Buildings and structures in Launceston, Tasmania
Hydro Tasmania dams
Dams completed in 1955
Gravity dams
1955 establishments in Australia